The Best of Jim Reeves Vol. II is a compilation album by Jim Reeves, released in 1965 on RCA Victor.

Track listing

Charts

References 

1965 compilation albums
Jim Reeves albums
RCA Victor compilation albums